Meristata is a genus of Asian leaf beetles in the subfamily Galerucinae. Most of the species in the genus are found along the Himalayas in the China and the Indian Subcontinent.

Species in the genus include:
 Meristata dohrnii 
 Meristata elongata 
 Meristata fallax 
 Meristata fraternalis 
 Meristata pulunini 
 Meristata quadrifasciata 
 Meristata sexmaculata 
 Meristata spilota  (synonym: Meristata trifasciata )

The species Meristata jayarami  was moved to the genus Leptarthra, and the species Meristata maculata  was moved to the genus Paraspitiella.

References

Galerucinae
Chrysomelidae genera
Taxa named by Embrik Strand